Oakwood Theme Park (formerly Oakwood Leisure Park, Oakwood Coaster Country & Oakwood Park) is a theme park in Pembrokeshire, Wales.

Oakwood opened in the late 1980s as a very small family park with BMXs, a wooden fort, a 3D-style cinema experience show, go-karts and a water chute ride. The park later incorporated four large thrill rides: Megafobia (1996), Vertigo (1997), Drenched (2002, as Hydro) and Speed (2006) which was a Gerstlauer Euro-Fighter roller coaster with a 97-degree drop. It was the first Euro-Fighter in the United Kingdom and was at that time the steepest roller coaster in the UK. The  CCI-built wooden roller coaster Megafobia was rated by enthusiasts soon after its installation as amongst the best in Europe. In 2016, it celebrated 20 years at Oakwood.

History
Until March 2008, Oakwood Leisure Ltd. was owned and developed by the McNamara family, Pembrokeshire farmland owners who diversified into the leisure industry in 1987 after the introduction of milk quotas. The park took twelve months to research.

Oakwood Park Railway
A  gauge narrow gauge railway operates on site at Oakwood. The railway, which is well established, is not listed amongst the park's rides and attractions, but forms part of the operational infrastructure, providing a transport link between the theme park and the car park. Travelling on the railway is included in the cost of the park admission ticket. Until 2016, the railway was operated by four diesel locomotives; two were American-style (though British-built) steam outline engines, and the others were a standard diesel outline locomotive and a diesel railcar. Since 2016, only one non-themed diesel locomotive is being used, the other three locomotives having been retired. Open 20-seater "Severn Lamb" type toast rack carriages are used in warm weather, with enclosed 20-seater former Liverpool Garden Festival coaches used year-round.

Development into Theme Park (1996–2008) 
Following an increase in visitor numbers after the arrival of the Snake River Falls water coaster in 1994, the management decided to pursue the development of the park into a more 'thrilling' theme park. In 1996, the park received a wooden roller coaster from the American firm of Custom Coasters International. Built at a cost of £1.7m, Megafobia allowed the park to reach 500,000 visitors in one season for the first time. In 1996, Oakwood also began an annual After Dark event, with late-night opening, fireworks, entertainment and discounted evening entry. Several major additions would follow in the coming years: Vertigo, a sky swing, in 1997, Bounce, a shoot and drop tower, in 1999, Hydro (later Drenched) in 2002 and Speed: No Limits in 2006.

New era for Oakwood (2009– )
Following the change of hands to Aspro Ocio S.A in March 2008, Oakwood Theme Park has seen a range of changes, in particular to staffing, with restructuring of both seasonal and permanent staff levels in line with market conditions.

In February 2010, a new logo was premiered on the front page of Oakwood's new leaflet and Facebook page. The new image was the first logo for the park to change the initial 'train stop' shape around the name (a shape that was used on the original Megafobia logo). There is now a blue corkscrew section of a coaster with the words Oakwood and Theme Park in a box underneath.

In late 2012, the park announced that it was starting a five-year investment plan.

In 2013, Kidz World was redeveloped into Neverland. The park added a number of rides, including Skull Rock, Crocodile Coaster, Neverland Chase, Jolly Roger, Aerodrome, London Taxi Ride, Tink's Flying School (Formally Plane Crazy), Journey to Neverland and the Lost Boy Adventure. The park also relocated some of the children's rides to the old Plane Crazy site and created Circus Land.

Soundtracks 
Oakwood's soundtrack was composed by Nick Hutson who created the soundtrack for Oakwood itself, the parks signature After Dark event and the ride Megafobia which is located at Oakwood as a part of the parks rebrand in 2018. Oakwood previously didn't have a soundtrack for the park and often used relevant pop songs around the park.

The soundtrack for Oakwood is based on a Traditional Welsh tune called Suo-Gân which is often played at the parks entrance, stage area and gift shop area.
These soundtracks are subjectively very repetitive, and utilise built-in Logic Pro instruments which lack professionalism.

Chronological development 

1987: Park opening. The bobsleigh, the assault courses and go karts are present at opening. Only the bobsleigh remains.

1988: Nutty Jake's Gold Mine (Family Dark Ride).

1989: Treetops Family Roller Coaster.

1991: Jake's Music Hall animatronic stage show (Jake's Town).

1994: Snake River Falls Family Water Ride. At the time this was a rather substantial addition to the small leisure park. The addition of the falls, saw the removal of 2 of the 8 original assault courses (courses 7 and 8) as the falls was built on the zip line area of one of the courses.

1995: Play Town Farm for children including tractor ride. Further development on this area was planned but never came to fruition.

1996: Megafobia, a wooden roller coaster.

1997: Vertigo Sky Coaster. Kiddie Coaster (now Clown Coaster) in Play Town. General park face-lift.

1999: Assault Course is first of Oakwood's original attractions to face the axe as part of the park's expansion. This makes way for the Bounce Tower Coaster in 27 March, the park's third white-knuckle attraction. Guest Relations is added, it is a tourist information centre as well as a second first aid base, also, it is a link between guests and park, complaints, lost property and lost children are its main duties.

2000: Jake's Town is axed. Voodoo Mansion now occupies the site of Jake's Music Hall. Play Town is revamped with the launch of Kidz World and the addition of the Wacky Factory.

2001: Nutty Jake's Gold Mine, already closed since 2000, is now transformed into Brer Rabbit's Burrow.

2002: Hydro becomes the biggest ride to arrive since Megafobia 6 years earlier. Both Senior and Junior go-karts are axed.

2003: Voodoo Mansion is revamped into "Spooky 3D" for Whitsun.

2004: Plane Crazy is opened on the site of the old Junior go-karts.

2005: Speed does not arrive as intended due to the Hydro tragedy of the previous Easter. Hydro itself is re-opened following closure through almost all of the 2004 season. It re-opens with a new boat interior with improved restraints and some degree of re-branding (primarily a new colour: red). The Magic Factory is the new children's attraction for this year. Oakwood's after-dark show loses its laser-water screen; it is replaced by "dancing" fountains, a series of illuminated water-jets choreographed to music.

2006: Speed Euro-Fighter (Now Speed: No Limits) is opened on the site of the old Senior Go-Karts.

2007: Oakwood relocates its Premier Theatre from New Orleans back to the Wacky Factory location, next to Plane Crazy. Wacky moves into Lost Kingdom, which loses its Bouncy Castles. Oakwood also holds an event for its 20th birthday allowing guests into the park for £2.95 for one day only.

2008: Oakwood's Late-night entertainment was cut to only one outdoor show (the Blues Brothers Band) with the removal of the "dancing" fountains. The park's fireworks also relocated to behind Speed, due to the parks neighbouring site, Bluestone. The park's future late-night entertainment is now in doubt due to the new ownership/management.

2009: New Spanish owners 'Aspro Ocio S.A' abolish Oakwood's summer entertainment event After Dark; the park extends its opening times by one hour during August and all entertainment is cut. No new attractions are added, making 2009 the third consecutive year with no new developments. A new POS system is introduced to speed up entry into the park.

2010: New logo released. Bounce has been repainted red and white, and there is an interior redesign.

2011: Hydro's name is changed to Drenched and the park undergoes another internal facelift. Water cannons are added to a newly created viewing platform near to the Drenched ride. A new traditional Sweet Shop opens. Late-night opening until 10pm returns on Wednesdays and Fridays in August. Fireman Sam makes a character appearance, and a high dive show opens in July running daily until the end of August. Brer Rabbit is rethemed for October half term to 'Scare Rabbit's Hollow'.

2012: The park celebrates its 25th birthday and modifies the park logo to advertise this fact. New Orleans theme is removed and Wild West reinstated to the area around Spooky 3D. Lost Kingdom is rebranded as 'Fun Factory' and the park receives a facelift with buildings, fences and rides being painted.

2013: Kidz World is removed and Neverland opens. This brings new (as well as re-themed) rides consisting of Skull Rock (log flume from Camelot Theme Park), Crocodile Coaster (also from Camelot), Tink's Flying School (Formally Plane Crazy), Neverland Chase, Lost Boys Adventure, Jolly Roger, Hooks House of Havoc (indoor play area), Journey to Neverland, Aerodrome and the London Taxi Ride.  The park had a rebranding of Sky Leap into Moon Landing, a relocation of some kids rides to the old 'Plane Crazy' area and creating the new 'Circus Land'  consisting of the Clown Coaster, Kids Carousel, Circus Express and Scorches Playground.  In October 2013 the park announced via their Facebook page that Brer Rabbit would close at the end of the 2013 season!

2014: The Legend of Sleepy Hollow should have opened in the summer but was pushed back a year. It will eventually replace Brer Rabbit. According to Clare Stansfield (Oakwood's new Head of Marketing), “The park invested £4.5 million in its new Neverland area and this year we have more major investment that will see the creation of a new soft play area, a children’s ride, a whole new themed restaurant and something very exciting planned for the summer!”

2015: No rides were added, making it the second year the new area was delayed.

2016: The announcement of a new area called Dahl land, to be based on the writings of Roald Dahl, to open that year. The project was delayed, making 2016 the third year with no new rides. The introduction of the 'Spooktacluar' event for Halloween was a big hit for Oakwood, with the 'Spooked alive: House of Horrors', 'The curse of the lost souls' and two scare zones. Megafobia also reached 20 years at the park and its trains received a gold or silver colour scheme. Bounce was also closed to make improvements to the ride.

2017: Flight of the Giant Peach was opened in the new area called Dahl land.

2018: The Roald Dahl theming was dropped, with Flight of the Giant Peach being renamed Creepy Crawler and the area became Spooky Street.

2019: Dizzy disk, a spinning disk shaped ride manufactured by DINIS Amusement Equipment located in the former circus land area. Also, the reintroduction of Bounce was planned for the summer. Despite this, Bounce did not open due to the refurbishment taking longer than anticipated. The teacups from Circusland were moved to Spooky Street and named Witches' Brew.

2021: Bounce (which closed in 2016) is expected to open in the 2021 summer as mentioned by Oakwood maintenance workers.

2022: Bounce has reopened after being SBNO since 2016 and has received a refurbishment.

Theming
Although the park claims to be a "theme park", the only themed area until 2013 was the small section of the park which now houses "Brer Rabbit's Burrow" and "Spooky 3D". (It is arguable that the park's former section for young children, Kidz World, formerly known as Play Town, is also themed.) This section of the park was formerly known as "Jake's Town" and featured a "wild-west" type theme. After the closure of "Nutty Jake's Goldmine", the area's main attraction, and the closure of an animatronic stage show also set to the "wild-west" theme, the area became known as "New Orleans". New Orleans featured a "ghost train" called Voodoo Mansion (2000) set in the original showbuilding for the animatronic stage show, and a children's "dark ride" known as "Brer Rabbit's Burrow" (2001). Both the voodoo religion and the children's character Brer Rabbit are associated with the deep south of America, the locality of the actual New Orleans. However, it is likely that the themes' connection (particularly that of Brer Rabbit) would have been lost on most members of the public due to its obscure nature.

Shortly after the construction of Voodoo Mansion, the ride was unexpectedly rebranded as "Spooky 3D" (2003). While some argue that the ride was closed due to lack of interest from the public; this is unlikely as the ride essentially remains in place under the re-branding of Spooky 3D. Others argue that the ride was closed for ulterior reasons, namely the ride's politically incorrect portrayal of the voodoo religion. It is to be noted that even aside from political correctness the voodoo religion remains a controversial subject matter. The New Orleans area was re-branded back to Wild West in 2012.

Summer 2013 brought a new development consisting of a Neverland theme, from Peter Pan which opened on 23 May 2013.  As part of the redevelopment, some of the children's rides were relocated to form a second themed area called 'Circus Land', occupying the former 'Plane Crazy' area (aimed at children under 8).

In 2014, local chocolatiers Wickedly Welsh Chocolate set up a Willy Wonka themed chocolate bar in the park.

Seasonal and holiday operation
The face and atmosphere of Oakwood changes throughout the year, marking holidays and summer operation.
Summer: In 1996, the same year Megafobia was opened, Oakwood launched its "after dark" late summer openings. The tradition continued until the 2008 season, before re-launching in 2011.
Halloween: In 2000, Oakwood launched annual "eerie evenings" following the opening of Voodoo Mansion, but discontinued them a few years later. Oakwood then relaunched its Halloween event in 2008 during the day for the October half term. In 2011 Oakwood rethemed Brer Rabbit as Scare Rabbit's Hollow, suitable for ages 10+, and opened a horror maze (surcharge) at the nearby Oakwood Bowl site. For 2013, Oakwood launched its "Halloween Spooktacular" event, which was held over five days. The "Spooktacular" event included "Spooky Live" (Spooky 3D in the dark with a number of live actors), "Theatre of Nightmares" (a walk-through scare maze attraction with live actors and animals for ages 16+) and "The Ghost of Skull Rock" show, which was held in the new Neverland area for all ages and featured Captain Hook, Tinkerbell and The Lost Boys. The evening ended with a firework display in Neverland.
Christmas: In 1995, Oakwood made a practice of opening the original children's area, Play Town, themed as a winter wonderland. In conjunction with this, the park held an annual Christmas pantomime in which minor celebrities would often undertake parts. Despite the relative popularity and success of the Christmas opening, the park decided to discontinue this venture.

Rides and attractions

Roller coasters

Past attractions

Incidents

Hydro

In April 2004, a 16-year-old was killed after falling approximately 100 ft from the top of the Hydro ride. The accident was attributed to human error after CCTV footage showed staff had not checked the rider's restraint was in a safe position. The ride was closed until the next season, when it reopened with more secure over-the-shoulder restraints instead of lap bars.

In 2006, the coroner's tribunal into the accident returned a narrative verdict on the death with some indication that the accident was more the result of the restraints being improperly secured by staff as opposed to fundamentally inadequate in and of themselves. The inquest reported that CCTV footage taken at the ride before the boat left clearly showed that the victim's lap bar was in an "open and unsafe position". Other CCTV footage showed both operators had failed to properly check that passengers were secure.

On 18 May 2007, the Health and Safety executive reported that Oakwood would be prosecuted, and in February 2008 the HSE charged Oakwood for not ensuring that guests were properly and safely restrained. The case against Oakwood was committed for trial at Swansea Crown Court on 7 July 2008 where Oakwood pleaded guilty to breaching the Health and Safety Act 1974. On 18 December, the park was fined £250,000 in addition to £80,000 legal costs, a penalty which was described by the victim's close family as inadequate. High Court Judge Justice Lloyd-Jones who passed the sentence had earlier commented that safety breaches at the theme park had created "the potential for really serious injury to very large numbers of people".

In 2011, Hydro was renamed Drenched.

Treetops 
On 23 October 2022, there was an incident on the Treetops roller coaster. Wales Air Ambulance took away a patient, who had reportedly fallen from one of the rearmost carriages of the ride. The park was evacuated and closed whilst the HSE investigated with Dyfed Powys Police.

Takeover by Aspro Ocio A.S. (March 2008)
During the course of late 2007 local press in Pembrokeshire reported that Oakwood had been made the subject of a takeover bid

The park was sold to Aspro Ocio S.A. of Spain as of March 2008.

See also

Tourism in Wales

References

External links

Oakwood Theme Park Official Website
Oakwood Theme Park at ThemeParks-UK

Buildings and structures in Pembrokeshire
Amusement parks in Wales
Tourist attractions in Pembrokeshire
Aspro Parks attractions
1987 establishments in Wales
Amusement parks opened in 1987
Martletwy